An Election to the Edinburgh Corporation was held on 3 November 1919, alongside municipal elections across Scotland.

Aggregate results

Ward Results

Canongate

Merchiston

References

1919
1919 Scottish local elections